MOL is a manufacturer of specialist trucks and trailers, based in Hooglede, Belgium. It was founded in 1944.

In the 1970s, MOL made a variety of oilfield trucks with air-cooled Magirus Deutz engines. MOL bought the rights to Willème truck designs, and some MOL ballast tractors continued to be based on these trucks for some years, after Willème went bankrupt. MOL continues to export heavy oilfield trucks.

MOL also took over BREC project to build KFM "Desert Lion" trucks; MOL expanded and upgraded the design, and sold it as the MOL-Brec TB 800. These were 6x6 offroad tractors for desert conditions, with 816 hp MWM V12 engines and 26 tonne unladen weight. MOL also made matching trailers, with additional 400 hp engines.

In 2014, Enafor ordered ten HF5066 and 55 HF7566 trucks, to haul oil exploration equipment in the Sahara. These are fitted with Cummins QSX15 engines and Allison transmissions. The HF7566 trucks have 6x6 drive, 600 horsepower, and can haul 200 tonnes in sandy conditions.

MOL also makes shunters and dock spotters; the FM250 has a Mercedes OM906 engine and 4x4 transmission, and is designed for Ro-Ro operations.

References

External links
 MOL website
 Photo of the TB800

Truck manufacturers of Belgium
Companies based in West Flanders
Hooglede